The Zeb Kendall House, at 159 University Ave. in Tonopah, Nevada, United States, was built in 1906.  It was listed on the National Register of Historic Places in 1982.

It was deemed significant for its association with Zebeniezer "Zeb" Kendall (d.1954), a prominent Tonopah citizen who developed mining interests, operated the Palace Hotel, and represented Nye County in the Nevada state legislature.  It is also significant for its architecture as a well-preserved Neo-Colonial wood-frame structure.

References 

Houses completed in 1906
Houses on the National Register of Historic Places in Nevada
National Register of Historic Places in Tonopah, Nevada
Houses in Nye County, Nevada
1906 establishments in Nevada